Henriëtte Catharina Rinzema (born 4 July 1985) is a Dutch politician from the People's Party for Freedom and Democracy. She has been an Member of the European Parliament since January 2022.

Political career 
Rinzema replaced Liesje Schreinemacher in the European Parliament when she was appointed to the Fourth Rutte cabinet.

References 

Living people
1985 births
21st-century Dutch women politicians
21st-century Dutch politicians
21st-century women MEPs for the Netherlands
People's Party for Freedom and Democracy MEPs
MEPs for the Netherlands 2019–2024
Leiden University alumni